The Gross Lohner (also spelled Gross Loner), is a limestone mountain of the Bernese Alps, located between Adelboden and Kandersteg in the Bernese Oberland. The mountain features several other peaks, from east to west:

 Nünihorn, 
 Hinder Lohner (Rear Lohner), 
 Mittler Lohner (Central Lohner), 
 Mittaghorn, 

The Lohner range is located east of Adelboden in the Engstlige valley and southwest of Kandersteg in Kander valley. The Gross Lohner is separated from the Chlyne Lohner (Small Lohner) to the north by the Bunderchrinde Pass, which provides a hiking route between Adelboden and Kandersteg.

The first tourist to climb the Lohner was one C. Dürheim from Bern in July 1876. In August of the same year, four members of the Alpine Club, during another ascent, found a bottle with the names of the two Kandersteg mountain guides Ogi and Hari, dated 1875.

Approximately halfways up the rock face, the Lohner hut can be found, which can be reached by skilled hikers without proper climbing.

The mountain with its many screes is almost only accessible by one of its three ridges. From the Lohner hut, the Mittler Lohner can be reached via the face by skilled climbers.

References

External links

Gross Lohner on SummitPost
Gross Lohner on Hikr

Mountains of the Alps
Alpine three-thousanders
Mountains of Switzerland
Mountains of the canton of Bern